The Unboxed Set is a compilation album by punk rock band Angry Samoans, released in 1995. It features all the songs from their first four albums.

Track listing
"Right Side of My Mind"
"Gimme Sopor"
"Hot Cars"
"Inside My Brain"
"You Stupid Asshole"
"Get Off the Air"
"My Old Man's a Fatso"
"Carson Girls"
"I'm a Pig"
"Too Animalistic (live)"
"Right Side of My Mind (Live)"
"Gas Chamber"
"The Todd Killings"
"Lights Out"
"My Old Man's a Fatso"
"Time Has Come Today"
"They Saved Hitler's Cock"
"Homo-Sexual"
"Steak Knife"
"Haizman's Brain Is Calling"
"Tuna Taco"
"Coffin Case"
"You Stupid Jerk"
"Ballad of Jerry Curlan"
"Not of This Earth"
"Different World"
"Electrocution"
"It's Raining Today"
"Unhinged"
"Psych-Out 129"
"Somebody to Love"
"I Lost (My Mind)"
"Wild Hog Rhyde"
"Laughing at Me"
"STP Not LSD"
"Staring at the Sun"
"Death of Beewak"
"Egyptomania"
"Attack of the Mushroom People"
"Feet on the Ground"
"Garbage Pit"
"(I'll Drink to This) Love Song"
"Lost Highway"

All tracks previously released.  Tracks 1-11 from Inside My Brain, 12-25 from Back from Samoa, 26-31 from Yesterday Started Tomorrow, 32-43 from STP Not LSD.

Angry Samoans albums
1995 compilation albums
Triple X Records compilation albums